Fripp may refer to:

 Fripp (novel), by Miles Tredinnick
 Fripp (surname)
 Fripp Island, South Carolina, U.S.
 "Fripp", song by the Catherine Wheel from Chrome

See also

Frip (disambiguation)